COcOnuts is the second album released by Jane, comprising Animal Collective member Panda Bear, and Scott Mou. It was originally self-released on CD-R's, but later became the first album released by Psych-o-path Records in 2005. The Psych-o-path version was remastered by Rusty Santos and Edik Kleyner.

Track listing
 Coconuts   23:51
 Ossie   25:40

2002 albums
Jane (American band) albums